Wang Chaowen (born October 1930) is a Chinese politician of Miao ethnicity who served as governor of Guizhou from 1983 to 1993 and chairman of Guizhou Provincial People's Congress from 1994 to 1998.

He was a member of the 12th, 13th and 14th Central Committee of the Chinese Communist Party. He was a member of the Standing Committee of the 8th and 9th National People's Congress.

Biography
Wang was born in Huangping County, Guizhou, in October 1930. He entered the workforce in December 1949, and joined the Chinese Communist Party (CCP) in July 1951. He was first party secretary of Shibing County in September 1956, and held that office until January 1960. He served as deputy secretary of Guizhou Provincial Committee of the Communist Youth League of China in February 1960, and was promoted to the secretary position in June 1973. In 1966, the Cultural Revolution broke out, he was removed from office and effectively sidelined, but soon reinstated in December 1969. In September 1977, he was admitted to member of the Standing Committee of the CCP Guizhou Provincial Committee, the province's top authority. In January 1980, he became vice governor of Guizhou, rising to governor in April 1983. He also served as deputy party secretary from March 1985 to November 1993. In January 1994, he became chairman of Guizhou Provincial People's Congress, a post he kept until January 1998. In March 1998, he took office as chairperson of the National People's Congress Ethnic Affairs Committee, serving in the post until his retirement in March 2003.

References

1930 births
Living people
People from Huangping County
Miao people
Governors of Guizhou
People's Republic of China politicians from Guizhou
Chinese Communist Party politicians from Guizhou
Members of the 12th Central Committee of the Chinese Communist Party
Members of the 13th Central Committee of the Chinese Communist Party
Members of the 14th Central Committee of the Chinese Communist Party
Members of the Standing Committee of the 8th National People's Congress
Members of the Standing Committee of the 9th National People's Congress
Chairpersons of the National People's Congress Ethnic Affairs Committee